Mompati Thuma (born 5 April 1981) is a Botswana footballer. He currently plays for the Botswana Defence Force XI in the Botswana Premier League.

Career
He has 84 caps for Botswana since his debut in 2004, making him the most capped player of the national team.

Personal life
Mompati Thuma is from a family of three and the only son from his family. He works as a public officer and soldier. He used to play karate as his favourite sport, which he practiced since his primary school days.

Statistics

International goals

References

External links

1980 births
Living people
Botswana footballers
Botswana Defence Force XI F.C. players
Botswana international footballers
Mogoditshane Fighters players
2012 Africa Cup of Nations players
Association football defenders